John Liu Shi-gong (18 August 1928 – 9 June 2017) was a Chinese Catholic bishop.

Ordained to the priesthood in 1956, Liu Shi-gong served as bishop of the Roman Catholic Diocese of Jining, China, from 1995 until his death in 2017.

Notes

1928 births
2017 deaths
People from Ulanqab
21st-century Roman Catholic bishops in China
20th-century Roman Catholic bishops in China